M. D. Sriyani Dhammika Menike (born 3 February 1970) is a former Sri Lankan female middle-distance runner. She competed in the women's 1500 metres at the 1992 Summer Olympics.

See also 
 Sri Lanka at the 1992 Summer Olympics

References

External links
 

1970 births
Living people
Olympic athletes of Sri Lanka
Sri Lankan female middle-distance runners
Athletes (track and field) at the 1992 Summer Olympics